Thai Regional Airlines was an airline based in Bangkok, Thailand. Their fleet includes Piper PA-31-350 Navajo Chieftain, and Airbus 320 aircraft.  Plan to start A320 service to Chieng Mai and Phuket on December 12, 2012, with promotion 1000 baht per seat net.  However, two days before Dec 12, the airline canceled all flights until Dec 24 leaving paid passengers no alternative.  On Dec 21, for the second time, the airline cancelled all flights until April 1 with "document and aircraft import difficulty" as a reason.  This time the airline offer a full refund to passengers. Most of the passengers however did not receive a refund and their calls to the office were not answered.

References

Defunct airlines of Thailand
Airlines established in 2011
Airlines disestablished in 2013
Thai companies established in 2011
Companies based in Bangkok